Patricia Whittaker is a Barbadian former cricketer who played as an all-rounder, batting right-handed and bowling right-arm medium-fast. She appeared in 11 Test matches and one One Day International for the West Indies between 1976 and 1979, including captaining the side in four matches. She scored four Test half-centuries and claimed 25 wickets at an average of under 20. She played domestic cricket for Barbados.

References

External links
 
 

Living people
Date of birth missing (living people)
Year of birth missing (living people)
West Indian women cricketers
West Indies women Test cricketers
West Indies women One Day International cricketers
West Indian women cricket captains
Barbadian women cricketers

ta:பெட்ரீசியா விட்டேகர்